The HXD1D (Chinese: 和谐1D型电力机车) is a semi-high speed electric locomotive developed by CSR Zhuzhou Electric Locomotive Co., Ltd in association with the Chinese Ministry of Railways Science and Technology Development department (Chinese: 铁道部科技司). It is capable of accelerating a 3,000-passenger, 20-carriage train to 160 km/h within five minutes.

There is a prototype without numbering, with  power and  max speed.

Gallery

Named locomotive 
 HXD1D-1898: "Zhou Enlai"

See also
 List of locomotives in China

References

External links

 

Electric locomotives of China
25 kV AC locomotives
Standard gauge locomotives of China
Railway locomotives introduced in 2012
Co′Co′ locomotives